The Seaward-class defence boats are large patrol craft designed by Mazagon Dock Limited (MDL) and built by Garden Reach Shipbuilders and Engineers (GRSE) for the Indian Navy. All of these vessels have been decommissioned, due to the large maintenance overhead they require.

Midlife refits
The ships of this class were built with low strength mild steel and thin plates, and consequently had low corrosion tolerance. As such adhering to prescribed docking intervals was essential.

INS Seaward (T54) was commissioned in September 1982. Its medium refit was due in March 1988 and its long refit in April 1992. Ignoring the vulnerability to corrosion of this ship, the medium refit was delayed by over three years and was carried out from July 1991 to April 1992. As a result, the long refit could not be planned. However, another short refit including the replacement of the engines was taken up in December 1993. The short refit was converted into a medium refit in February 1994. While carrying out repairs, extensive damage to the hull below the waterline was noticed in March 1994. The medium refit was extended to May 1996 because the engines and other materials procured for this ship were used for carrying out ongoing repairs on another, similar, ship (SDBT-55).

Ships

References

External links
  Seaward Defence Boats - Bharat Rakshak
 SDB - Seaward Defense Boats - Global Security

Patrol vessels of the Indian Navy